William Ludovic Brandon Bianda (born 30 April 2000) is a French professional footballer who plays as a centre-back for Serie A club Roma.

Club career
Bianda signed his first professional contract with RC Lens on 29 July 2017. He made his professional debut with RC Lens in a 2–2 Ligue 2 tie with Paris FC on 9 December 2017.

On 27 June 2018, A.S. Roma announced the signing of the French defender from Lens for €6 million, plus up to €5 million in bonus payments.

On 5 August 2020, he went to Zulte Waregem on loan.

On 22 August 2021, he joined Nancy on loan.

International career
Bianda was born in France and is of Ivorian descent. Bianda represented France at the 2017 UEFA European Under-17 Championship and the 2017 FIFA U-17 World Cup.

Career statistics

References

External links
RC Lens profile

2000 births
Living people
Sportspeople from Suresnes
French footballers
France youth international footballers
Association football defenders
A.S. Roma players
RC Lens players
S.V. Zulte Waregem players
AS Nancy Lorraine players
Ligue 2 players
Belgian Pro League players
French expatriate footballers
Expatriate footballers in Belgium
Expatriate footballers in Italy
French expatriate sportspeople in Belgium
French expatriate sportspeople in Italy
French sportspeople of Ivorian descent
Footballers from Hauts-de-Seine